Eleodiphaga is a genus of flies in the family Tachinidae.

Species
E. caffreyi Walton, 1918
E. martini Reinhard, 1937
E. pollinosa Walton, 1918

References

Diptera of North America
Exoristinae
Tachinidae genera